James A. McLaughlin (February 12, 1861 - January 19, 1927) was an American National Champion jockey in Thoroughbred racing and a Hall of Fame inductee.

Orphaned and homeless in his early teens, McLaughlin was taken in by horse trainer "Father Bill" Daly who taught him how to ride. Daly's 1931 Brooklyn Daily Eagle obituary was headlined as someone who "Developed Many Great Jockeys."  While individual statistics from all of McLaughlin's career races aren't documented, McLaughlin began his career riding in Tennessee in the late 1870s. Records show that he first competed in the Kentucky Derby in 1880 for the Dwyer Brothers Stable with trainer James G. Rowe, Sr. The following year the team won the race on the future Hall of Fame horse, Hindoo. McLaughlin finished second in the 1882 Derby and fifth in 1884.

The horse he claimed was the best he'd ever ridden was Luke Blackburn.

Jim McLaughlin won the 1885 Preakness Stakes riding Tecumseh but finished third with the horse in the Belmont Stakes. He rode three consecutive Belmont Stakes winners on two separate occasions, claiming victory six out of seven years. He won the race in 1882, 1883, and 1884 then finished third in 1885 and won then next three in 1886, 1887, and 1888. The last five of his Belmont winners were all for the Dwyer Brothers. McLaughlin's six Belmont wins still stands as the most for any jockey and is shared with Eddie Arcaro who won his sixth in 1955.

McLaughlin won more races than any jockey in the United States four consecutive times from 1884 through 1887. He rode in his last races in 1892 after which he worked for a time as a trainer and as a racetrack official.

Jim McLaughlin died in 1927 a few weeks short of his sixty-sixth birthday. On its formation in 1955, he was posthumously inducted in the National Museum of Racing and Hall of Fame.

References

American jockeys
American Champion jockeys
United States Thoroughbred Racing Hall of Fame inductees
1861 births
1927 deaths
Sportspeople from Hartford, Connecticut